Plateau (formerly called Rodin Gallery) was an art gallery in South Korea on Taepyeongno street in Jongno-gu, a central district of Seoul. The gallery contained sculptures of Auguste Rodin (1840–1917). It opened on the first floor of Samsung Life Insurance building on May 14, 1999, as 'Rodin Gallery'. In May 2011 the gallery was renamed 'Plateau' in order to better express its 'commitment to embracing the Korean and international contemporary Art Scene'. It closed in August 2016.

See also
Bukchon Art Museum
List of museums in South Korea
Seoul Museum of Art

References

External links

Art museums and galleries in Seoul
Jung District, Seoul
Art museums established in 1999
1999 establishments in South Korea